The 1968–69 NCAA University Division men's ice hockey season began in November 1968 and concluded with the 1969 NCAA University Division Men's Ice Hockey Tournament's championship game on March 15, 1969 at the Broadmoor World Arena in Colorado Springs, Colorado. This was the 22nd season in which an NCAA ice hockey championship was held and is the 75th year overall where an NCAA school fielded a team.

Wisconsin was admitted into the WCHA beginning with this season. Because they now played each of the other three Big Ten teams they were included into the informal conference standings.

Air Force and Notre Dame both begin to sponsor their ice hockey programs. Both teams start as independents.

Regular season

Season tournaments

Standings

1969 NCAA Tournament

Note: * denotes overtime period(s)

Player stats

Scoring leaders
The following players led the league in points at the conclusion of the season.

  
GP = Games played; G = Goals; A = Assists; Pts = Points; PIM = Penalty minutes

Leading goaltenders
The following goaltenders led the league in goals against average at the end of the regular season while playing at least 33% of their team's total minutes.

GP = Games played; Min = Minutes played; W = Wins; L = Losses; OT = Overtime/shootout losses; GA = Goals against; SO = Shutouts; SV% = Save percentage; GAA = Goals against average

Awards

NCAA

ECAC

WCHA

See also
 1968–69 NCAA College Division men's ice hockey season

References

External links
College Hockey Historical Archives
1968–69 NCAA Standings

 
NCAA